XX is a 2020 South Korean web series starring Ahn Hee-yeon, Hwang Seung-eon, Bae In-hyuk and Lee Jong-won. The 25-minute episodes were pre-released on V Live, Naver TV Cast, YouTube and Facebook's PlayList Global official channels on Wednesdays and Thursdays at 19:00 (KST). The 50-minute episodes aired on MBC TV on Friday nights at 00:50 (KST) from January 24 to February 21, 2020.

Synopsis
The story of Yoon Na-na, a bartender who works at the speakeasy bar XX.

Cast

Main
 Ahn Hee-yeon as Yoon Na-na
A skilled and friendly bartender who has been saving money in hopes to buy the bar XX. She hasn't been in a relationship since her boyfriend cheated on her with her former best friend, Lee Roo-mi, five years ago.
 Hwang Seung-eon as Lee Roo-mi
A business woman who comes from a rich family. She used to be Na-na's best friend. Unable to scout the latter for the second bar she is about to open, she decides to buy XX and keep Na-na as her employee.
 Bae In-hyuk as Park Dan-hee
A former athlete who put an end to his career after an accident. He decided to become a bartender after seeing Na-na's passion for her job and has been her colleague for two years. He secretly loves her. 
 Lee Jong-won as Wang Jeong-deun
Na-na's flatmate and best friend, he prefers to be called by his English name Jayden. He is always there to give Na-na's advice and comfort. He is a perfumer who owns a shop in Itaewon, Seoul.

Supporting
 Kim Joon-kyung as Jeong Gyu-min
Roo-mi's boyfriend. Because of his poor background, Roo-mi helped him with his tuition and living expenses. He now works at a large law firm and is suspected to be cheating on her with one of his colleagues. 
 Na Eun-saem as Lim Jang-mi
A lawyer who works closely with Gyu-min and is suspected to be having an affair with him.
 Shin Jae-hwi as Seo Tae-hyun
Na-na's former boyfriend who cheated on her with Roo-mi. He is now the director of Revan Cosmetics.
 Choi Jung-woo as Jayden's ex
Jayden's ex-boyfriend.

Special appearances
 Steve Noh as a customer (Ep. 3)

Original soundtrack

Part 1

Part 2

Part 3

Chart performance

Ratings
In this table,  represent the lowest ratings and  represent the highest ratings.

Awards

References

External links
  
 

South Korean drama web series
2020 web series debuts
2020 web series endings
Naver TV original programming
MBC TV television dramas
Korean-language television shows
2020 South Korean television series debuts
2020 South Korean television series endings
Playlist Studio original programming